Waldo Brian Donlevy (February 9, 1901 – April 6, 1972) was an American actor, active from the 1930s to the 1960s. Noted for playing dangerous and tough characters, he usually appeared in supporting roles. Among his best-known films are Beau Geste (1939), The Great McGinty (1940) and Wake Island (1942). For his role as the sadistic Sergeant Markoff in Beau Geste, he was nominated for the Academy Award for Best Supporting Actor.

He starred as U.S. special agent Steve Mitchell in the radio/TV series Dangerous Assignment.

His obituary in The Times newspaper in the United Kingdom said, "Any consideration of the American 'film noir' of the 1940s would be incomplete without him".

Early life
Donlevy was born in 1901 in Cleveland, Ohio, to Irish parents Rebecca (née Parks) and Thomas Donlevy, originally from Portadown, County Armagh. Sometime between 1910 and 1912, the family moved to Sheboygan Falls, Wisconsin, where Donlevy's father was a supervisor at the Brickner Woolen Mills.

Career

Broadway
Donlevy moved to New York City in his youth, where he modeled for illustrator J. C. Leyendecker, who produced illustrations for the famous Arrow Collar advertisements. His acting career began in the early 1920s, when he began appearing in theater productions, and eventually won parts in silent films. 

He had small roles in the silent films Jamestown (1923), Damaged Hearts (1924), Monsieur Beaucaire (1924), The Eve of the Revolution (1924), and School for Wives (1925).
He had a small role on Broadway in the play What Price Glory (1925), which was a big hit and ran for two years, establishing him as an actor. He was in the film A Man of Quality (1926).

On Broadway, he was in the popular musical Hit the Deck (1927–28), which ran for a year; then Ringside (1928), Rainbow (1928), and Queen Bee (1929). He had roles in the films Gentlemen of the Press (1929) and Mother's Boy (1929). On stage, he appeared in Up Pops the Devil (1930–31), Peter Flies High (1931), Society Girl (1931–32), The Inside Story (1932), and The Boy Friend (1932). He was in a film short with Ethel Merman, Ireno (1932); and another short with Ruth Etting, A Modern Cinderella (1932).

He returned to the stage for Three And One (1933) with Lilian Bond, a big personal success; No Questions Asked (1934); The Perfumed Lady (1934); and The Milky Way (1934). The latter led to him receiving a Hollywood offer to reprise his role in the film version, but he was unable to due to a production delay. He had a final Broadway success with Life Begins at 8:40 (1934) with Bert Lahr and Ray Bolger. After that show, Donlevy said "they were all signed for the movies. I thought that if they can make it, I'm going to take a crack too."

Hollywood
Donlevy's break came in 1935, when he was cast in the film Barbary Coast, directed by Howard Hawks and produced by Samuel Goldwyn. Later that year, he was cast in Mary Burns, Fugitive. The following year, he received second billing in It Happened in Hollywood, and had a supporting role in Goldwyn's Strike Me Pink and Paramount's 13 Hours by Air.

"B" leading man
Donlevy had his first lead in a B movie at Fox, Human Cargo (1936), playing a wisecracking reporter opposite Claire Trevor. He followed it with other "B" lead roles: Half Angel (1936), High Tension (1936), 36 Hours to Kill (1936), Crack-Up (1936) with Peter Lorre, and Midnight Taxi (1937).

He had a supporting role in an "A" movie, This Is My Affair (1937), with Robert Taylor, Barbara Stanwyck and Victor McLaglen; then starred in another "B", Born Reckless (1937). He was in In Old Chicago (1938) and was teamed with Victor McLaglen in Battle of Broadway (1938) and We're Going to Be Rich (1938). He starred in Sharpshooters (1938), and was the lead villain in the studio's prestigious Jesse James (1939).

Paramount
Paramount used Donlevy for a key role in Cecil B. De Mille's Union Pacific (1939), stepping in for Charles Bickford. He stayed at that studio for Beau Geste (1939). His performance in Beau Geste as the ruthless Sergeant Markoff earned him an nomination for an Academy Award for Best Supporting Actor. Donlevy went to Columbia to star in a "B film", Behind Prison Gates (1939), and went to RKO for a support part in Allegheny Uprising (1939). He was the villain in Universal's Destry Rides Again (1939).

Donlevy was then given the title role in The Great McGinty (1940) at Paramount, the directorial debut of Preston Sturges. It was not a big hit, but was profitable and received excellent reviews, launching Sturges' directing career. Donlevy later reprised the role several times on radio and television.

At Universal, Donlevy was in When the Daltons Rode (1940), then went into Fox's Brigham Young: Frontiersman (1940). He was fourth-billed in I Wanted Wings (1941); then MGM borrowed him to support Robert Taylor in Billy the Kid (1941). At Universal, he was top-billed in South of Tahiti (1941), and supported Bing Crosby in Birth of the Blues (1942).

Paramount gave him a star part in The Remarkable Andrew (1942), playing Andrew Jackson, then Columbia teamed him with Pat O'Brien in Two Yanks in Trinidad (1942). Edward Small hired him to play the lead in A Gentleman After Dark (1942) and he supported Joel McCrea and Barbara Stanwyck in Paramount's The Great Man's Lady (1942). In 1942, he starred in Wake Island with William Bendix and Robert Preston, playing a role based on James Devereux. The film, directed by John Farrow, was a huge success, as was the adaptation of Dashiell Hammet's classic The Glass Key (1942). At Universal, Donlevy starred in Nightmare (1942), and MGM borrowed him to support Taylor again in Stand By for Action (1942). Donlevy had the lead role in Fritz Lang's Hangmen Also Die! (1943), made for United Artists and co-written by Bertolt Brecht. He had a cameo as Governor McGinty in Sturges' The Miracle of Morgan's Creek (1944).

Donlevy was given the lead role in An American Romance (1944), directed by King Vidor for MGM, in a role intended for Spencer Tracy. It was a prestigious production, but the film was a box-office and critical disappointment. He had a cameo as himself in Duffy's Tavern (1945), and he was Trampas to Joel McCrea's The Virginian (1946). After playing the male lead in Our Hearts Were Growing Up (1946) he was borrowed by Walter Wanger for Canyon Passage (1946).

At Paramount, he was in Two Years Before the Mast (1946), although top billing went to Alan Ladd. Donlevy was originally going to play the sadistic captain, but wound up giving that role to Howard da Silva and playing Richard Dana instead. At Paramount, Donlevy supported Ray Milland in The Trouble with Women (1947), then went to Fox to play a heroic DA in Kiss of Death (1947) with Victor Mature and Richard Widmark. For UA, he supported Robert Cummings in Heaven Only Knows (1947), then went to MGM for the Killer McCoy (1947), a hit with Mickey Rooney; A Southern Yankee (1948) with Red Skelton; and Command Decision (1948) with Clark Gable. He supported Dorothy Lamour in The Lucky Stiff (1949) then starred in Arthur Lubin's Impact (1949).

Television
He appeared on television in The Chevrolet Tele-Theatre, and made two films for Universal-International, Shakedown (1950) and Kansas Raiders (1950) (playing William Quantrill opposite Audie Murphy's Jesse James). He did Pulitzer Prize Playhouse on TV, then went to Republic for Fighting Coast Guard (1951), Ride the Man Down (1952), Hoodlum Empire (1952) and Woman They Almost Lynched (1953); then filmed Slaughter Trail (1952) for RKO.

In 1952 he produced and starred in a TV series, Dangerous Assignment, which he had performed on radio from 1949 to 1954.

Donlevy focused on television: Robert Montgomery Presents, The Motorola Television Hour, Medallion Theatre, Star Stage, Climax!, Damon Runyon Theater, Kraft Theatre, Studio One in Hollywood, Crossroads, The Ford Television Theatre, The DuPont Show of the Month and Lux Video Theatre.

After a supporting role in The Big Combo (1955), Donlevy appeared in the British science-fiction horror film The Quatermass Xperiment (called The Creeping Unknown in the US) for Hammer Films, in the lead role of Professor Bernard Quatermass. The film was based on a 1953 BBC Television serial of the same name. The character had been British, but Hammer cast Donlevy in an attempt to help sell the film to North American audiences. Quatermass creator Nigel Kneale disliked Donlevy's portrayal, referring to him as "a former Hollywood heavy gone to seed". Nonetheless, the film was a success, and Donlevy returned for the sequel, Quatermass 2 (Enemy From Space in the US), in 1957, also based on a BBC television serial. It made him the only man to play the famous scientist on screen twice (although Scottish actor Andrew Keir later played him both on film and radio).

In between the films, Donlevy was in A Cry in the Night (1956). He had the lead in a "B" western, Escape from Red Rock (1957) and a supporting part in Cowboy (1958). He announced that he had formed his own production company for whom he would make a western, The Golden Spur, but it appears to have not been made. He guest-starred on TV in Rawhide, Wagon Train, Hotel de Paree, The Texan, The DuPont Show with June Allyson, Zane Grey Theater, and The Red Skelton Hour, had supporting roles in Juke Box Rhythm and Never So Few (both 1959), and had the lead in Girl in Room 13 (1960). He toured on stage in a production of The Andersonville Trial. He supported Jerry Lewis in The Errand Boy (1961) and Charlton Heston in The Pigeon That Took Rome (1962), and guested on Target: The Corruptors, Saints and Sinners, and The DuPont Show of the Week.

Later career
Donlevy had the lead in Curse of the Fly (1965) for Robert L. Lippert, and supported in How to Stuff a Wild Bikini (1965). In 1966, in one of the final episodes of Perry Mason, "The Case of the Positive Negative", he played defendant General Roger Brandon.

Donlevy's last performances included The Fat Spy (1966), an episode of Family Affair, new American footage shot in New York for Gamera the Invincible (1966), Five Golden Dragons (1967) for Harry Alan Towers, and the A.C. Lyles films Waco (1966), Hostile Guns (1967), Arizona Bushwhackers (1968), and Rogue's Gallery (1968).

His last film was Pit Stop, released in 1969.

Personal life
Donlevy was married to Yvonne Grey from 1928 to 1936. She divorced him on grounds of cruelty, and he agreed to pay $5,000 a month in alimony. He married actress Marjorie Lane in 1936. They had one child, and divorced in 1947. He was married to Lillian Arch Lugosi (the former wife of Bela Lugosi) from 1966 until his death in 1972.

Donlevy supported Thomas Dewey in the 1944 United States presidential election.

Death
Donlevy was operated on for throat cancer in 1971 and died from the disease on April 6, 1972, at the Motion Picture Country Hospital in Woodland Hills, Los Angeles, California. He was 71. His ashes were scattered over Santa Monica Bay.

Selected filmography

Damaged Hearts (1924) as Jim Porter
Monsieur Beaucaire (1924) as Ball Guest at Bath (uncredited)
 School for Wives (1925) as Ralph
A Man of Quality (1926) as Richard Courtney
Gentlemen of the Press (1929) as Kelly – Reporter (uncredited)
Mother's Boy (1929) as Harry O'Day
A Modern Cinderella (1932, short)
Barbary Coast (1935) as Knuckles Jacoby
Mary Burns, Fugitive (1935) as Spike
Another Face (1935) as Broken Nose Dawson / Spencer Dutro III
Strike Me Pink (1936) as Vance
13 Hours by Air (1936) as Dr. James L. Evarts
Human Cargo (1936) as Packy Campbell
Half Angel (1936) as Duffy Giles
High Tension (1936) as Steve Reardon
36 Hours to Kill (1936) as Frank Evers
Crack-Up (1936) as Ace Martin
Midnight Taxi (1937) as Charles 'Chick' Gardner
This Is My Affair (1937) as Batiste Duryea
Born Reckless (1937) as Bob 'Hurry' Kane
In Old Chicago (1937) as Gil Warren
Battle of Broadway (1938) as Chesty Webb
We're Going to Be Rich (1938) as Yankee Gordon
Sharpshooters (1938) as Steve Mitchell
Jesse James (1939) as Barshee
Union Pacific (1939) as Sid Campeau
Beau Geste (1939) as Sergeant Markoff
Behind Prison Gates (1939) as Agent Norman Craig / Red Murray
Allegheny Uprising (1939) as Callendar
Destry Rides Again (1939) as Kent
The Great McGinty (1940) as Dan McGinty
When the Daltons Rode (1940) as Grat Dalton
Brigham Young (1940) as Angus Duncan
I Wanted Wings (1941) as Capt. Mercer
Billy the Kid (1941) as Jim Sherwood
Hold Back the Dawn (1941) as Movie Actor (uncredited)
South of Tahiti (1941) as Bob
Birth of the Blues (1941) as Memphis
The Remarkable Andrew (1942) as General Andrew Jackson
Two Yanks in Trinidad (1942) as Vince Barrows
A Gentleman After Dark (1942) as Harry 'Heliotrope Harry' Melton
The Great Man's Lady (1942) as Steely Edwards
Wake Island (1942) as Maj. Geoffrey Caton
The Glass Key (1942) as Paul Madvig
Nightmare (1942) as Daniel Shane
Stand By for Action (1942) as Lt. Cmdr. Martin J. Roberts
Hangmen Also Die! (1943) as Dr. Franticek Svoboda / Karel Vanek
The Miracle of Morgan's Creek (1943) as Governor McGinty
An American Romance (1944) as Stefan Dubechek aka Steve Dangos
Duffy's Tavern (1945) as Brian Donlevy
The Virginian (1946) as Trampas
Our Hearts Were Growing Up (1946) as Tony Minnetti
Canyon Passage (1946) as George Camrose
Two Years Before the Mast (1946) as Richard Henry Dana
The Beginning or the End (1947) as Major General Leslie R. Groves
Song of Scheherazade (1947) as Capt. Vladimir Gregorovitch
The Trouble with Women (1947) as Joe McBride
Kiss of Death (1947) as Assistant D.A. Louis D'Angelo
Heaven Only Knows (1947) as Adam 'Duke' Byron
Killer McCoy (1947) as Jim Caighn
A Southern Yankee (1948) as Kurt Devlynn
Command Decision (1948) as Brigadier General Clifton I. Garnet
The Lucky Stiff (1949) as John J. Malone
Impact (1949) as Walter Williams
Shakedown (1950) as Nick Palmer
Kansas Raiders (1950) as Col. William Clarke Quantrill
Fighting Coast Guard (1951) as Commander Ian McFarland
Slaughter Trail (1951) as Capt. Dempster
Hoodlum Empire (1952) as Senator Bill Stephens
Ride the Man Down (1952) as Bide Marriner
Woman They Almost Lynched (1953) as Charles Quantrill
The Big Combo (1955) as Joe McClure
The Quatermass Xperiment (1955, USA title The Creeping Unknown) as Prof. Bernard Quatermass
A Cry in the Night (1956) as Capt. Ed Bates
Quatermass 2 (1957, originally titled Quatermass II, Enemy from Space; known in USA as The Enemy from Space) as Quatermass
Escape from Red Rock (1957) as Bronc Grierson
Cowboy (1958) as Doc Bender – Trail Hand
Juke Box Rhythm (1959) as George Manton
Never So Few (1959) as Gen. Sloan
Girl in Room 13 (1960, shot in Brazil) as Steve Marshall
The Errand Boy (1961) as Tom 'T.P.' Paramutual
The Pigeon That Took Rome (1962) as Col. Sherman Harrington
Curse of the Fly (1965) as Henri Delambre
How to Stuff a Wild Bikini (1965) as B.D. 'Big Deal' MacPherson
The Fat Spy (1966) as George Wellington
Waco (1966) as Ace Ross
Gammera: The Invincible (1966) as Gen. Terry Arnold
Five Golden Dragons (1967) as Dragon #3
Hostile Guns (1967) as Marshal Willett
Arizona Bushwhackers (1968) as Mayor Joe Smith
 Rogue's Gallery (1968) as Detective Lee
Pit Stop (1969) as Grant Willard (final film role)

Television appearances

Radio appearances

References

Further reading
 
Sculthorpe, Derek. Brian Donlevy, the Good Bad Guy: A Bio-Filmography. McFarland & Company, 2016. .

External links

Brian Donlevy profile, Virtual-History.com

1901 births
1972 deaths
Male Western (genre) film actors
Male actors from Wisconsin
Male actors from Cleveland
American people of Irish descent
American male film actors
American male silent film actors
American male television actors
Deaths from esophageal cancer
Deaths from cancer in California
People from Sheboygan Falls, Wisconsin
20th-century American male actors
Paramount Pictures contract players
Ohio Republicans